Hye-young, also spelled Hye-yeong or Hye-yong, is a Korean feminine given name. Its meaning differs based on the hanja used to write each syllable of the name. There are 16 hanja with the reading "hye" and 34 hanja with the reading "young" on the South Korean government's official list of hanja which may be registered for use in given names.

People with this name include:

Entertainers
 Lee Hye-young (actress, born 1962), South Korean actress
 Lee Hye-young (actress, born 1971), South Korean actress
 Jung Hye-young (born 1973), South Korean actress
 Ryu Hye-young (born 1991), South Korean actress

Sportspeople
 Hwang Hye-young (born 1966), South Korean badminton player
 Yoon Hye-young (born 1977), South Korean archer and Olympic champion
 Son Hye-yong (born 1980), North Korean archer
 Byun Hye-young (born 1983), South Korean swimmer
 Kim Hye-yeong (born 1995), South Korean football player

Others
 Pyun Hye-young (born 1972), South Korean writer

Fictional characters
 Artist Hye-young, in 2006 South Korean film Daisy
 Ahn Hye-young, in 2014 South Korean television series The Idle Mermaid
Byun Hye-young, in 2017 South Korean television series My Father Is Strange
Lee Hye-yeong (李惠永), one of the two leading male characters in South Korean Netflix original series Love Alarm (2019-2021)

See also
List of Korean given names

References

Korean feminine given names